Pokémon: Advanced Challenge is the seventh season of Pokémon and the second season of Pokémon the Series: Ruby and Sapphire, known in Japan as . It originally aired in Japan from September 4, 2003, to September 2, 2004, on TV Tokyo, and in the United States from September 11, 2004, to September 10, 2005, on Kids' WB.

Set in the fictional Hoenn region, the season follows the adventures of the ten-year-old Pokémon trainer Ash Ketchum, and his electric mouse partner Pikachu as they collect Gym Badges so they can compete in the Hoenn League competition. Along the way, they are joined by Brock, the leader of the Pewter City Gym, and the Pokémon coordinator May and her brother, Max, as May competes in Pokémon Contests with the aim of earning Ribbons so she can enter the Hoenn Grand Festival.

The episodes were directed by Masamitsu Hidaka and produced by the animation studio OLM.



Episode list

Music
The Japanese opening songs are "Advance Adventure" (アドバンスアドベンチャー, Adobansu Adobenchā) by GARDEN for 30 episodes, and "Challenger!!" (チャレンジャー！！, Charenjā!!) by Rika Matsumoto for 22 episodes. The ending songs are "Polka O Dolka" (ポルカ・オ・ドルカ, Poruka O Doruka) by Inuko Inuyama and Nolsol Chorus Group for 4 episodes, Toshiko Ezaki performed "Because the Sky is There" (そこに空があるから, Soko ni Sora ga Aru Kara) for 7 episodes, and "Smile" (スマイル, Sumairu) for 42 episodes, "Full of Summer!!" (いっぱいスーマ!!, Ippai Sumā!!) by Naomi Tamura and Himawari Chorus for 8 episodes, "Smile" (スマイル, Sumairu) by Toshiko Ezaki for 1 episode, and the English opening song is "This Dream" by David Rolfe. A shortened version is used as the end credit song.

Home media
In the United States, the series was released on 10 DVD volumes by Viz Media between 2005-2006.

Viz Media and Warner Home Video later released Pokémon: Advanced Challenge – The Complete Collection on DVD on December 5, 2017.

References

External links 
 
  at TV Tokyo 
  at TV Tokyo 
  at Pokémon JP official website 

2003 Japanese television seasons
2004 Japanese television seasons
Season07